Short transient receptor potential channel 3 (TrpC3) also known as transient receptor protein 3 (TRP-3) is a protein that in humans is encoded by the TRPC3 gene. The TRPC3/6/7 subfamily are implicated in the regulation of vascular tone, cell growth, proliferation and pathological hypertrophy. These are diacylglycerol-sensitive cation channels known to regulate intracellular calcium via activation of the phospholipase C (PLC) pathway and/or by sensing Ca2+ store depletion. Together, their role in calcium homeostasis has made them potential therapeutic targets for a variety of central and peripheral pathologies.

Function 

Non-specific cation conductance elicited by the activation of TrkB by BDNF is TRPC3-dependent in the CNS. TRPC channels are almost always co-localized with mGluR1-expressing cells and likely play a role in mGluR-mediated EPSPs.

The TRPC3 channel has been shown to be preferentially expressed in non-excitable cell types, such as oligodendrocytes. However, evidence suggests that active TRPC3 channels in basal ganglia (BG) output neurons are responsible for maintaining a tonic inward depolarizing current that regulates resting membrane potential and promotes regular neuronal firing. Conversely, inhibiting TRPC3 promotes cellular hyperpolarization, which can lead to slower and more irregular neuronal firing.  While it's unclear if TRPC3 channels have equal expression, other members of the TRPC family have been localized to the axon hillock, cell body, and dendritic processes of dopamine-expressing cells.

The neuromodulator, substance P, activates TRPC3/7 channels inducing cellular currents that underlie rhythmic pacemaker activity in the brainstem, enhancing the regularity and frequency of respiratory rhythms, showing homology to the mechanism described in BG neurons. Transgenic cardiomyocytes expressing TRPC3 show prolonged action potential duration when exposed to a TRPC3 agonist. The same cardiomyocytes also increase their firing rate with agonist exposure under a current-clamp tetanus protocol suggesting that they may play a role in cardiac arrhythmogenesis.

Modulators 

A small molecule agonist is GSK1702934A and antagonists are GSK417651A and GSK2293017A. A commercially available inhibitor is available in the form of a pyrazole compound, Pyr3 TRPC3 has been shown to specifically interact with TRPC1 and TRPC6.

See also 
 Transient receptor potential channel
 TRPC

References

Further reading

External links 
 

Ion channels